Tatiana Cordero Velázquez (February 23, 1961 - April 13, 2021) was an Ecuadorian feminist, considered one of the forerunners in the fight for women's rights and for LGBT rights in the country. At the time of her death, she was the director of the Urgent Action Fund for Latin American and the Caribbean, an association that she had founded. 

In 1989, together with the activist Nela Meriguet, she created the Women's Communication Workshop, a feminist organization that focused its efforts on developing maps about femicide cases in Ecuador and on promoting educational projects that questioned heteronormativity. Cordero Velázquez was also notable for denouncing the existence of so-called "de-homosexualization clinics", both in Ecuador and abroad.

In 1991, Cordero Velázquez co-wrote the book  (literally "We, the happy women") with Ecuadorian feminists Rosa Manzo Rodas and Marena Briones Velasteguí. The book focused on prostitution in Ecuador, referencing the personal experiences of Ecuadorian sex workers in Asociacion de Mujeres Autonomas "22nd de Junio" (June 22nd Association of Autonomous Women), a labor union for female sex workers.

She died of cancer on April 13, 2021 in Quito. Among the people who publicly lamented her death were the Vice President of the Quito Board of Rights, Sybel Martínez, and the municipal health secretary, Ximena Abarca.

Cordero Velázquez was a lesbian.

References

1961 births
2021 deaths
Ecuadorian LGBT people
20th-century Ecuadorian women
Ecuadorian women activists
Lesbian feminists
Ecuadorian feminists
21st-century Ecuadorian women